Daniel Vandermeulen is a Canadian educator. 

He became president of Nunavut Arctic College in 2007.  

In August 2012, he was appointed Nunavut's Deputy Minister of Executive and Intergovernmental Affairs, and Secretary to Cabinet. 

Previously working in Alberta, he is President Emeritus of Northern Lakes College, and past president of Northern Lakes College (1987-2005).

References

Living people
Canadian university and college chief executives
Year of birth missing (living people)